Micavibrio aeruginosavorus is a species of epibiotic predatory bacteria. Unlike Bdellovibrio, Micavibrio do not invade the periplasmic space of their prey, but feed by attaching themselves to its surface.

For its predatory qualities, M. aeruginosavorus is being considered as an antibacterial.

References

Alphaproteobacteria